The Development Cup, also known as Dev Cup is a British quidditch tournament that runs parallel to the annual British Quidditch Cup, catering for those teams that did not qualify for the latter. The tournament is organised by QuidditchUK, the sport's national governing body, and follows International Quidditch Association rules. The inaugural event, held on 29–30 April 2017, was won by the Liverpuddly Cannons from Liverpool.

First tournament, April 2017
The first Development Cup took place on the 29–30 April 2017 at Horspath Athletics Ground in Oxford. There were 9 teams in attendance. Four of whom, the Liverpuddly Cannons, St Andrews Snidgets, Holyrood Hippogriffs Seconds team and UCLan Quidditch entered after coming in the bottom four places at Northern Cup 2016. The only team from Southern Cup 2016 to not qualify for British Quidditch Cup 2017 in this manner was The Flying Chaucers from the University of Kent but they declined to attend Development Cup, or indeed any team event for the remainder of that season. Also amongst the teams at Dev Cup were those who had either failed to attend regionals for varying reasons or who had been created after. The newly minted seconds teams of Sheffield Quidditch Club and London Unspeakables competed as well as the Bournemouth Banshees, Glasgow Grim Reapers and Bath Quidditch Club.

Structure 
The tournament consisted of a round-robin of all 9 teams, in order to give each side the maximum amount of competitive experience it could - for many sides, such as Bath and Glasgow, it was the first tournament they had competed at. Two of the teams quickly established themselves as dominant from the early stages: Liverpool and Edinburgh would go essentially unchallenged for the entire event, their match against each other being the only snitch-range game (played within 30 points) either would contest over the weekend. They went 7-0 and 6-1 respectively and won gold and silver. Bath established themselves firmly in third place with a 5-3 record, which included a dramatic double-overtime result against London.

Indicates that this score included a snitch-catch during regulation play.
^Indicates that this score included a snitch-catch during overtime play.
 London defeated Preston 100^-60 in overtime. 
Bath defeated London 100^*-70 in double overtime.
Preston defeated Glasgow 70-60 in double overtime.

Final standings 
The final standings at the end of the tournament were:

Second Tournament, April 2018 
The second Development Cup took place on the 14–15 April 2018 at the University of York. It did not follow the round-robin format of its predecessor, instead utilising a rotating pool structure followed by a knockout bracket. The rotating pool format, known as the 'Naftel Slide', would seed a Pod 1 team into each of four pools with two unseeded opponents. After an initial round-robin, the top team in each pool 'slid' into the pool to the left, and the bottom team similarly moved to the right.

Development Cup 2018 featured 13 teams, most of whom having attended their respective regional tournament but not having qualified for the British Quidditch Cup. Three teams were 'mercenary' squads formed from the merger of two existing clubs who had been unable to field a full roster alone. The teams were grouped as follows:

First round 
The first round of gameplay proceeded as follows:

Second round 
The teams at the top of each pool; Glasgow, London, Bath and Derby, all as-yet undefeated, moved one place to the left, whilst the bottom teams (including the bottom two teams from Pool D) moved one place to the right. The new pools thus constructed were;

This led to a second round of pool play with the following results:

Final rounds 
Following this second stage of pool play, the teams were divided between those who had played four games and those who had played five. The top four teams in each category entered a single-elimination bracket, whilst the bottom five played a consolation round comprising play-in elimination matches and a round-robin of the three surviving teams. The tournament was won in a commanding fashion by the Glasgow Grim Reapers, who defeated an injury-laden Bath Quidditch Club 160*-0. Meanwhile the St Andrews Snidgets picked up Bronze over the Oxford Quidlings.

Final standings

Third tournament, March 2019 
The third Development Cup took place on the 2–3 March 2019 at the Salford Sports Village in Manchester. 11 teams competed over the weekend and three slots at the British Quidditch Cup in April 2019 were available for the winners. These were claimed by Winchester Wampus, London Unstoppables and the Chester Centurions (although Winchester Wampus did not attend BQC 2019). There were also coaching workshops scheduled over the weekend with the aim to help improve teams' skills and knowledge on topics such as ball handling, contact and refereeing.

Fourth tournament, March 2020 
The fourth Development Cup took place on the 7–8 March 2020 and was again held at the Salford Sports Village in Manchester. 9 teams competed over the weekend, with three slots available for the winners at the upcoming British Quidditch Cup in April 2020. However BQC 2020 ended up being cancelled due to COVID-19. Just like in the previous tournament, various coaching workshops were run over the weekend. In phase 1, teams were split into three groups of 3 teams each and played in a round-robin style. Phase 3 consisted of a knockout tournament to determine the final winner.

The full results were as follows:

Phase 1 - Group stage

Phase 2

Phase 3 - Knockout tournament/Consolidation Round Robin

Final standings

Fifth tournament, April 2022 
Due to COVID-19, no Development Cup took place in 2021. The fifth tournament took place on 23 April 2022 at the Derby Rugby Club in Derby. 3 teams competed over the day with Bangor Broken Broomsticks winning the tournament. 

The full results were as follows:

Final standings

Sixth tournament, April 2023 
The sixth Development Cup is scheduled to take place on 15 April 2023 in Derby.

References

Quidditch competitions